Bongokuhle Hlongwane (born 20 June 2000) is a South African soccer player who plays as a forward for MLS side Minnesota United and the South African national team.

Club career

Maritzburg United
Hlongwane grew up in Nxamalala, Pietermaritzburg and played for Nxamalala Fast XI in the SAFA Regional League before joining Maritzburg United's academy. He made his debut for the club in a 1–0 defeat to Orlando Pirates in April 2019 and scored his first goal for the club a month later against Tshakhuma Tsha Madzivhandila in the relegation play-offs. He was nominated for the South African Premier Division Young Player of the Season award for the 2020–21 campaign. In July 2021, he signed a new one-year contract with the club.

Minnesota United
On 5 January 2022, MLS club Minnesota United announced the signing of Hlongwane to a three-year contract with a one-year club option.

International career
Hlongwane was first called up to the South African national team in July 2019, and made his international debut on 28 July as a substitute in a 3–2 defeat to Lesotho. On 8 June 2021, he made his second appearance and full debut for South Africa against Uganda and scored his first international goal following a "fortunate deflection" in a 3–2 win. On 6 September 2021, he scored against Ghana in a World Cup qualifier as South Africa won 1–0.

Career statistics

Club

International

Scores and results list South Africa's goal tally first, score column indicates score after each Hlongwane goal.

References

External links

Living people
2000 births
South African soccer players
Association football forwards
Maritzburg United F.C. players
Minnesota United FC players
South African Premier Division players
Sportspeople from Pietermaritzburg
South Africa international soccer players
Major League Soccer players